HDCopy is a disk image application for floppy disks that runs in MS-DOS. It can copy a floppy on the fly, or by using archives with IMG file extension that store the content of the disk with a proprietary file format (whose first three bytes noted in hexadecimal will be FF 18, and its size will be anything).
For the proprietary file format compression can be used or deactivated. The compression algorithm is called "Byte-Run-2-Algorithm" by the author.

It was written by Oliver Fromme and is distributed as cardware.

Do not confuse the HD in its name with hard disk. HD represents high density (floppy disks with capacity greater than 1.2 MB).

In the early 90s, when floppy diskettes for PCs were widely used, HDCopy was extremely popular in many places. Its usage started to decline as floppy disks became less widely used.

The last released version of HDCopy is 2.0a. There is also a version 3.0a developed later by a Chinese programmer, which is not to be confused with Fromme's version.

Features 
The program can handle a large variety of non-standard formats and in many cases automatically recover bad sectors.

To use these images you may need to restore the image using HDCopy and then create a raw image of it using RawWrite, dd, WinImage, etc. You may also need to use a virtual floppy drive to emulate a floppy drive.

See also 
Track0
VGA-Copy

References

External links
Free Download of HD-Copy (Archived)

DOS software